Adomeit is a Germanised form of the Baltic-origin surname Adomaitis, means "son of Adam". People with this surname include:

 George Adomeit (1879–1967), American painter and printmaker; father of Ruth
 Ruth E. Adomeit (1910–1996), American author, editor, collector of miniature books and philanthropist; daughter of George

See also 
 Adomaitis (Lithuanian form)
 (Horst) Ademeit (similar name)